Sibel Duman (born 23 February 1990) is a Turkish female association footballer, who plays for Beşiktaş J.K. in the Turkish Women's Super League with jersey number 13. She was part of the Turkey women's national football team between 2011 and 2014.

Club career 

Duman played for Maltepe Yalıspor (2007–2009), Çamlıcaspor (2009–2011) and Lüleburgaz 39 Spor (2011–2012). For the 2012–13 season, she transferred to the Izmir-based club Konak Belediyespor, and enjoyed her first league championship at the end of the season.

Playing for Konak Belediyespor at 2013–14 UEFA Women's Champions League, she scored her first international goal in the match against NSA Sofia on 8 August, and then her team's only goal in the match against Cardiff City on 13 August 2013.

For the 2015–16 season, She transferred to Trabzon İdmanocağı. The next season, she could not appear on the ground due to injury of cruciate ligament rupture.

Duman joined Beşiktaş J.K. in the 2017–18 season. After playing in the first half of the 2018–19 First League season for Kireçburnu Spor, she transferred to Ataşehir Belediyespor.

In the 2021-22 Turkcell Women's Super League season, she joined the newly established club Fatih Karagümrük.

In July 2022, she returned to her former club Beşiktaş J.K. for the 2022-23 Super League season.

International career 
Duman was admitted to the Turkey U-19 national team in 2008, and played in two friendly matches that year. In 2011, she became a member of the Turkey women's national team, and played against Greek and Portuguese teams in friendly matches. On 31 March 2012 Duman played the last six minutes in the Turkish  national team's UEFA Women's Euro 2013 qualifying – Group 2 match against Switzerland that lost 0–5.

She took part at the 2015 FIFA Women's World Cup qualification – UEFA Group 6  matches, and netted a goal against Montenegro.

Career statistics 
.

Honours 
 Turkish Women's First Football League
Konak Belediyespor
 Winners (3): 2012–13, 2013–14, 2014–15

Beliktaş J.K.
 Runners-up (1): 2017–18

References

External links 

Sibel Duman at Turkish Football Federation
 

1990 births
Living people
People from Kartal
21st-century Turkish sportswomen
Footballers from Istanbul
Turkish women's footballers
Konak Belediyespor players
Lüleburgaz 39 Spor players
Turkey women's international footballers
Women's association football defenders
Trabzon İdmanocağı women's players
Beşiktaş J.K. women's football players
Kireçburnu Spor players
Ataşehir Belediyespor players
Fatih Karagümrük S.K. (women's football) players
Turkish Women's Football Super League players